Zero Point Five Love is a 2014 Chinese romance film directed by GengXiao. It was released on September 12, 2014.

Cast
Purba Rgyal
Jessie
Jie Xi
Yue Ming Li

Reception
It has earned ¥0.54 million at the Chinese box office.

References

2014 romantic comedy films
2014 films
Chinese romantic comedy films